The British League Division Two Knockout Cup (known as the National League Knockout Cup between 1976 and 1990 in line with the name of the league) was a motorcycle speedway Knockout Cup competition in the United Kingdom governed by the Speedway Control Bureau (SCB), in conjunction with the British Speedway Promoters' Association (BSPA). The teams from the second and lowest tier of league racing, the British League Division Two, took part. Similar competitions have been held within the leagues that succeeded the British League.

Competition format
The competition was run on a knockout principle; teams drawn together race home and away matches against each other, with the aggregate score deciding the result. In the event of the aggregate score being level, the teams again raced home and away against each other until the tie was decided by an aggregate win.

Winners

See also
Knockout Cup (speedway) for full list of winners and competitions

References

External links
British Speedway Promoters' Association website

Speedway competitions in the United Kingdom